The Renault Triber is a mini MPV with three-row seating produced by the French car manufacturer Renault through its Indian subsidiary Renault India. It was introduced in India on 19 June 2019 and went on sale in August 2019.

Development 

Developed under the body code "RBC", the Triber is built on top of the CMF-A platform like the Kwid. Despite that, the car is built with over 90% dedicated parts not shared with other Renault and Nissan vehicles since it is a larger and wider car in the CMF-A family.

Laurens van den Acker, Corporate Design of Groupe Renault said the interior of the car is a "miracle" and refers to it as "a bit of a Leonardo da Vinci" as it offers three-row seating in a sub-four metre length. This was achieved by making the bonnet and engine bay as short as possible, making it not possible to fit a diesel engine or any larger petrol engine to the car. The stretched wheelbase and the reduced overhang also contributed to the spacious cabin space which Van den Acker claimed is around 3 metres long. The second row seats comes with a reclining and split folding function. There is a dedicated AC vent for the third row of seats, armrests and charging sockets.

One of the difficult parts of the development of the Triber is maximizing the headroom for the third-row passengers, as the space is usually occupied by the rear hatch door hinge mechanism. The rear part of the roof is raised, allowing more headroom and a roof-mounted air conditioner blowers. The roof bump is masked by the roof rail, making it less visible.

The car is also designed with a faux-crossover look, which Van den Acker said "gives the car a much tougher stand, and brings it in an SUV sphere". It would also make the car appeal to consumers in India who prefers a high driving position and high ground clearance.

Powertrain 
The transmission options for the Triber are a 5-speed manual and a 5-speed automated manual gearbox.

Export markets 
The Triber is exported to nearby right-hand drive emerging markets such as Indonesia and South Africa. It was introduced in Indonesia on 12 July 2019 and displayed at the 27th Gaikindo Indonesia International Auto Show from 18 to 28 July 2019. Renault received 1,033 bookings for the Triber at the show. The Triber started to be delivered to customers in March 2020. The RXZ trim of Triber in Indonesia has 15-inch dual-tone alloy wheels unseen in other markets. The South African introduction was also followed later in February 2020.

The Triber was went on sale in the Brunei market in late July 2022, marking the return of the Renault brand in the Brunei market after 9 years. It is offered in RXZ variant.

Sales

Safety 

The Indian-manufactured Triber was tested in its most basic safety specification for India (double frontal airbags, no ISOFIX) by Global NCAP in 2021 (similar to Latin NCAP 2013), and scored four stars for adult occupant protection and three stars for child occupant protection. The vehicle's passenger compartment became unstable during the frontal crash test, but footwell intrusion and rupture was insignificant. The Q1.5 dummy which was installed rearward-facing scored full points in the dynamic test, but the Q3 dummy was installed forward-facing and its head crossed excursion limits, showing poor protection. The recommended child restraints for the test were Britax BabySafe Group 0+ and Britax Duo Plus Group I for the 1.5 year-old and the 3 year-old respectively. Both restraints were installed using a three-point seatbelt, because the Triber does not offer ISOFIX anchorages in its basic safety specification.

The Triber for the Indian market is available with double frontal airbags as standard and can be equipped with optional side torso airbags. ESC is not available on the Triber. The Triber does not offer three-point seatbelts and head restraints in all seating positions. ISOFIX anchorages are only available on higher variants.

References

External links 

 

Triber
Cars introduced in 2019
2020s cars
Mini MPVs
Front-wheel-drive vehicles
Global NCAP small MPVs